The Sula Islands Regency is one of the regencies in North Maluku province of Indonesia. It covers a land area of 3,338.67 km2 and consists of two of the three large islands comprising the Sula Archipelago, together with minor adjacent islands. These two islands are Sulabesi (formerly Sanama) and Mangoli (formerly Mangole). The third island, Taliabu, was split off from the Sula Islands Regency in 2013 to form a separate regency.

Pre-Indonesian Independence saw the Sula Islands also known as the Xulla Islands, with Taliabo as Xulla Taliabo, Sanana as Xulla Bessi, and Mangoli as Xulla Mangola.

Administration 
Sula Islands Regency comprises twelve districts (kecamatan), tabulated below with their areas and populations at the 2010 Census and the 2020 Census. The table also includes the locations of the district administrative centres, and the number of villages (rural desa and urban kelurahan) in each district.

History
The Dutch built a fort on Sanana in 1652. Wallace visited the islands during an ornithological expedition in 1862.

Economy
According to government data, Sula Islands Regency's food crops include vegetables, groundnuts, cassava, sweet potatoes, durian, mangosteen and mango.  the area of agriculturally active land was 24743.56 hectares with production amounting to 33,608.62 tons per year. Taliabu-Sanana District is the main producer of cloves, nutmeg, cocoa, copra and other coconut products. Fishery production is very diverse with and estimated sustainable potential of 40,273.91 tonnes per year of which only 22.8 percent is currently exploited. Forestry is considered a potential industry with the natural forest-based Classification Map TGHK RTRWP suggesting a forest area of 471,951.53 hectares, but much of this is protected or hard to access, due to steep slopes and transportation logistics, and the islands' main plywood company, PT Barito Pacific Timber Group (in Falabisahaya, West Mangoli) has closed. Industrial activity is very limited. There is a gold mine in East Mangoli District (at Waitina and Kawata) and coal mines are located in the peninsula of West Sulabesi District, East Taliabu and Sub Sanana (Wai Village Ipa). Reserves of coal are estimated around 10.4 million tonnes.

Tourism
The Indonesian Ministry of Tourism (Kemenpar) is ready to support the promotion of tourism destination potential on Sula Islands. Demographically located between the crossroads of Wakatobi and Raja Ampat tourist areas, it is ideally developed as marine tourism and special interest tourism for diving enthusiasts. 

One of the support is Maksaira Festival at Wai Ipa Beach to Bajo Village Beach. On 2018 the festival as a cultural and marine tourism attraction event has entered the third year and will be listed as MURI record breaking for the largest grouper fishing participant targeted by 3000 participants in 2018, where year 2017 followed by 1700 participants.

Fauna
The following species are native to the Sula Islands:
Buru babirusa Babyrousa babyrussa
Banggai cuscus Strigocuscus pelengensis
Sula rat Rattus elaphinus
Sulawesi flying fox Acerodon celebensis
Lesser short-nosed fruit bat Cynopterus brachyotis
Greenish naked-backed fruit bat Dobsonia viridis
Long-tongued nectar bat Macroglossus minimus
Pallas's tube-nosed bat Nyctimene cephalotes
Ashy-headed flying fox Pteropus caniceps
Sulawesi rousette Rousettus celebensis
Swift fruit bat Thoopterus nigrescens
Small Asian sheath-tailed bat Emballonura alecto
Fawn leaf-nosed bat Hipposideros cervinus
Small bent-winged bat Miniopterus pusillus
Sula megapode Megapodius bernsteinii (Gosong Sula), status vulnerable

Introduced species include:
 Asian house shrew 
 Wild boar (Sus scrofa) 
 Polynesian rat (Rattus exulans)

References

External links

 Tourist guide to the Sula Islands
 Investment Coordinating Board (BKPM) Profile of the Sula Islands
 Investment Prospects in Sula (in Indonesian)

Regencies of North Maluku
Islands of Indonesia
Populated places in Indonesia